Echlin is a surname. Notable people with the surname include:

Charles Echlin (1682–1754), Irish politician
Elizabeth, Lady Echlin ( 1704–1782), English writer
Robert Echlin (disambiguation), multiple people
Kim Echlin (born 1955), Canadian novelist, translator, editor, and teacher
Echlin baronets